Jane Hayden (born 1957) is an English stage, television, and film actress.

Early life
Hayden was born in Harrow, Middlesex, the younger sister of Linda Hayden, although their name at birth was Higginson. Their screen surname is an adaptation of their father's first name; he was Haydn Henley Higginson. 
Both sisters trained at the Aida Foster Theatre School, and Jane Hayden's first screen role came in 1970, when she played a child in a BBC television film about Lenin, Out of This Spark: The Making of a Revolutionary.<ref name=rt>Radio Times, Volume 187 (G. Newnes, 1970), p. 51</ref>

FilmographyOut of This Spark: The Making of a Revolutionary (BBC, 1970) as ChildWarship (1973) as SamanthaThe Awakening of Emily (1976) as RachelAdventures of a Taxi Driver (1976) as LindaRobin's Nest (1977) as Air HostessKiller's Moon (1978) as JulieReturn of the Saint (1978) as AileenShillingbury Tales'' (1981) as Emily

Notes

External links

People from Harrow, London
English film actresses
English television actresses
1957 births
Living people
Alumni of the Aida Foster Theatre School